Yerofey Pavlovich Khabarov or Svyatitsky (the first name is often spelled Ярофей (Yarofey) in contemporary accounts; 1603 – after 1671), was a Russian entrepreneur and adventurer, best known for his exploring the Amur river region and his attempts to colonize the area for Russia.  For background see Russian–Manchu border conflicts.

The major Russian city of Khabarovsk, as well as the small town and railway station Yerofey Pavlovich (located on the Trans-Siberian railroad in Amur Oblast) bear his name. 

A native of the Veliky Ustyug area in the northern European Russia, Khabarov was a manager for the Stroganovs at the saltworks in Solvychegodsk. In 1625, Khabarov sailed from Tobolsk to Mangazeya. Three years later, he left the town with his expedition and reached the Kheta River (eastern part of Taimyr). In 1630, Khabarov took part in a voyage from Mangazeya to Tobolsk. In 1632–1641, he reached the Lena River and founded a farming settlement with saltworks along the Lena at the mouths of the Kuta and Kirenga Rivers. Now his descendants live in Stavropol.

First Expedition 1649–50

In 1649 he became the second Russian to explore the Amur after Vassili Poyarkov (1643–1646). Poyarkov's route up the Aldan River was too difficult to be practical. At some point Khabarov attempted to reach the Amur via the Vitim River.  In 1647 a hunter returned to Yakutsk from the Olyokma River and reported that this might lead to the Amur. In the spring of 1649 Khabarov set off at his own expense up the Olyokma River, then its branch, the Tungir and portaged to the Shilka River. Reaching the upper Amur (Dauria) in early 1650, he found the country nearly deserted, the cossacks' reputation having preceded them. Having pioneered a good route, he returned to Yakutsk in May, 1650 and gave his report. He praised the land, warned of the danger of Chinese intervention and suggested a larger expedition with professional soldiers.

Second Expedition 1650–53

Given the time delays in communicating with Moscow, the Yakutsk Voivode Dmitry Frantsbekov decided to act on his own and sent Khabarov back south with a larger force. The voivode also gave Khabarov letters from His Majesty Tsar Alexis to the Daurian Prince Lavkai of Albazin and "Prince Bogdoi"   asking those potentates to submit to the Russian Tsar, and threatening to send a 6,000-strong army if they don't obey.

Frantsbekov assumed that this Prince Bogdoi was another Siberian chieftain. He was, in fact, the Emperor of China.

Khabarov crossed the mountains in the fall of 1650 and this time was met with armed resistance. He built winter quarters at Albazin at the northernmost point of the Amur.  After receiving reinforcements in June 1651 he set off down the Amur. By September they reached the mouth of the Sungari. By 29 September they reached Achansk near present-day Khabarovsk and decided to winter there. On 8 October they were attacked by about 1,000 local people, who, being defeated, appealed to their Manchu overlords. On March 24, 1652, a force of 2,000 Manchus and Koreans armed with artillery arrived from Ninguta and attacked Achansk. Khabarov somehow managed to defeat them. (The Manchu general, Haise, was later executed for his incompetence) Not knowing how many more Chinese were in the area, on 22 April he withdrew up the Amur. At one point he encountered another force of 6,000 Chinese, but was able to slip around them under cover of fog and darkness. Further upstream he met a force of 117 cossacks who had been sent as reinforcements. He learned from a captive that a new Manchu army was being gathered on the Sungari. On August 1 he reached the mouth of the Zeya. Here 136 of his men mutinied leaving only 212 loyal. (Since Khabarov mentions the mutiny immediately after mentioning the question of where to build winter quarters, it may have been connected with the question of whether it was wise to remain on the Zeya and await a possible Manchu attack.) From the Zeya he sent a report  to the Yakutsk Voivode matter-of-factly describing the burning of villages, slaughter of natives and the torture of prisoners. 

From this point the English sources become unclear. They apparently wintered at the Zeya. In the fall of 1653, 150 reinforcements under Dimitry Zinoviev appeared. As a nobleman, Zinoviev demanded full command. When Khabarov refused, he was arrested. Unable to gain the support of Khabarov's men and having no adequate way to deal with the Manchus, Zinoviev and part of the force withdrew from the Amur. Onufriy Stepanov was left in charge of those who remained.

Khabarov was deprived of his rank and property and was sent on a fifteen-month journey to Moscow to be tried. After a year's delay he was acquitted. He was given a minor noble rank (Syn boyarsky of Ilimsk) on the condition that he return to Siberia. He reappears again in the records in 1658 when the Siberian Office ordered that he be placed in irons if he refused to guide a new expedition to the Amur. After that he disappears from the records.

Khabarov charted the Amur river in his "Draft of the Amur river".

See also 
Albazinians
Oros Niru

References

Sources 
W Bruce Lincoln, The Conquest of a Continent, 1994

1603 births
17th-century deaths
City founders from the Tsardom of Russia
Explorers of Asia
Explorers from the Tsardom of Russia
17th-century explorers